The Women's 100m Breaststroke event at the 2007 Pan American Games took place at the Maria Lenk Aquatic Park in Rio de Janeiro, Brazil, with the final being swum on July 19.

Medalists

Results

References
For the Record, Swimming World Magazine, September 2007 (p. 48+49)
agendapan

Breastroke, Women's 100
2007 in women's swimming